Harry de Vlugt  (26 May 1947 – 6 November 2016) was an Indonesian-born Dutch footballer who played in the Eredivisie, Regionalliga Nord, National Soccer League, and Bundesliga.

Playing career 
De Vlught was born in the Dutch East Indies, and emigrated to Netherlands in his youth. He began playing in 1961 with SC Enschede, and later played in the Eredivisie with FC Twente. He also had a stint with GVV Eilermark at the amateur level. In 1969, he went abroad to play in the National Soccer League with the German Canadians FC, and Toronto Croatia. In 1971, he returned to Europe to play in the Regionalliga Nord with SV Meppen, where he recorded 18 goals. The following season he was signed by Rot-Weiss Essen of the Bundesliga, where in his debut season he scored 11 goals in 22 matches. In 1974, he missed the majority of the season after sustaining an injury, as a result was released at the conclusion of the season. De Vlught died on November 6, 2016.

References 

1947 births
2016 deaths
Dutch footballers
FC Twente players
Toronto Croatia players
SV Meppen players
Rot-Weiss Essen players
Canadian National Soccer League players
Bundesliga players
Sportspeople from Bandung
Association football midfielders
Dutch expatriate footballers
Expatriate soccer players in Canada
Dutch expatriate sportspeople in Canada
Expatriate footballers in Germany
Dutch expatriate sportspeople in Germany